Wayne A. "Beaner" McBean (born February 21, 1969) is a Canadian former professional ice hockey defenceman.  McBean played professionally in the National Hockey League with the Los Angeles Kings, New York Islanders, and Winnipeg Jets.

Playing career 
During his junior career, McBean played in the WHL for Medicine Hat Tigers, notably accumulating 85 assists over three years.  He was also a member of two Memorial Cup-winning teams in 1987 and 1988.  In 1987, he was named to the WHL East first All-Star team and the Memorial Cup All-Star team and was the recipient of the Stafford Smythe Memorial Trophy as the tournament MVP. In 1988 McBean played for Canada in the World Junior Championship, winning a gold medal.

He was selected by the Los Angeles Kings 4th in the 1st round of the 1987 NHL Entry Draft. On February 22, 1989 Wayne was traded from the Los Angeles Kings with Mark Fitzpatrick and future considerations to the New York Islanders for goaltender Kelly Hrudey and Yan Kaminsky, but spent the bulk of his time in the minor leagues, recording the assist on the Calder Cup championship winning goal for the Isles' American Hockey League affiliate Springfield Indians in 1990. He retired in 1994 after sustaining a wrist injury.

Career statistics

Regular season and playoffs

International

Awards
 WHL East First All-Star Team – 1987

References

External links
 

1969 births
Living people
Canadian expatriate ice hockey players in the United States
Canadian ice hockey defencemen
Capital District Islanders players
Los Angeles Kings draft picks
Los Angeles Kings players
Medicine Hat Tigers players
National Hockey League first-round draft picks
New Haven Nighthawks players
New York Islanders players
Salt Lake Golden Eagles (IHL) players
Ice hockey people from Calgary
Springfield Indians players
Winnipeg Jets (1979–1996) players